{{Speciesbox
| image = Hypsiboas_boans02.jpg
| status = LC
| status_system = IUCN3.1
| status_ref = 
| genus = Boana
| species = boans
| authority = (Linnaeus, 1758)
| synonyms =  
 Rana boans Linnaeus, 1758
 Rana maxima Laurenti, 1768
 Rana palmata Lacépède, 1788
 Rana palmata Bonnaterre, 1789
 Calamita maximus Schneider, 1799
 Calamita boans Schneider, 1799
 Hyla boans Daudin, 1800
 Hyla palmata Latreille in Sonnini de Manoncourt and Latreille, 1801
 Hyla maxima Oken, 1816
 Calamita palmatus Merrem, 1820
 Hypsiboas palmata Wagler, 1830
 Hypsiboas palmatus Tschudi, 1838
 Lobipes palmata Fitzinger, 1843
 Cinclidium granulatum Cope, 1867
 Hyla lactea Lönnberg, 1896
 Hyla daudini Lutz, 1973
 Hypsiboas boans <small>Faivovich et al'., 2005</small>

}}

The rusty tree frog (Boana boans), also known as the giant gladiator treefrog, is a species of frog in the family Hylidae found in South America and Panama. Its natural habitats are subtropical or tropical moist lowland forests, rivers, and intermittent freshwater marshes. In some areas, it is sympatric with H. rosenbergi''.

Names
It is called ukato in the Kwaza language of Rondônia, Brazil.

References

Boana
Amphibians of Bolivia
Amphibians of Brazil
Amphibians of Colombia
Amphibians of Ecuador
Amphibians of French Guiana
Amphibians of Guyana
Amphibians of Panama
Amphibians of Peru
Amphibians of Suriname
Amphibians of Trinidad and Tobago
Amphibians of Venezuela
Taxonomy articles created by Polbot
Amphibians described in 1758